Idahoan (I-dah-HO-an) can mean:

 A resident or native of Idaho
 A conservative newspaper, The Idahoan
 Idahoan (train), a passenger train operated by the Union Pacific
 An Idaho based DJ, The Idahoan